The Assistant Secretary of the Army (Civil Works), abbreviated ASA(CW), is an office of the United States Department of the Army responsible for overseeing the civil functions of the United States Army. The Assistant Secretary of the Army (Civil Works) reports to the United States Under Secretary of the Army, who in turn reports to the United States Secretary of the Army

Functions overseen by the Assistant Secretary of the Army (Civil Works) include the Civil Works of the United States Army Corps of Engineers; control of the United States National Cemetery and the United States Soldiers' and Airmen's Home National Cemetery; and the foreign non-military works of the Army Corps of Engineers. The Assistant Secretary of the Army (Civil Works) is the civilian responsible for overseeing the work of the Chief of Engineers.

The position of Assistant Secretary of the Army (Civil Works) was created by Section 211 of the Flood Control Act of 1970 and reaffirmed in Section 501 of the Goldwater–Nichols Act of 1986.

Assistant Secretaries of the Army (Civil Works), 1975–Present

Deputy Assistant Secretaries
Reporting to the Assistant Secretary of the Army (Civil Works) are:

 Principal Deputy Assistant Secretary of the Army (Civil Works)
Deputy Assistant Secretary of the Army (Civil Works

References

External links 
 

United States Army civilians
United States Army organization